Leucocroton havanensis is an endemic species to Cuba. It is located on serpentine soils and limestone rock in the western and central part of the country. It is an evergreen tree that has dioecious flowering, meaning the species has distinct male and female individuals. The plant only grows on a small serpentine island.

Cultivation and uses
The uses by this plant are purely for studying and discovering because it is a newly discovered species and much research has to be done to find its uses. However, scientists have discovered that the genus Leucocroton is a nickel hyperaccumulator, which means it can absorb dangerous amounts of nickel.

References

Adelieae
Flora of Cuba
Flora without expected TNC conservation status